Erik Albert Bjurberg (1 June 1895 – 22 June 1976) was a Swedish road racing cyclist who won the Bronze Medal in the 1924 Summer Olympics.

References

External links
 

1895 births
1976 deaths
Cyclists at the 1924 Summer Olympics
Olympic cyclists of Sweden
Olympic bronze medalists for Sweden
Olympic medalists in cycling
Medalists at the 1924 Summer Olympics
People from Solna Municipality
Swedish male cyclists
Sportspeople from Stockholm County
19th-century Swedish people
20th-century Swedish people